The 1986–87 OJHL season is the 15th and final season of the Ontario Junior Hockey League (OJHL). The four teams of the league played an interlocking 44-game season with the Northern Ontario Junior Hockey League.  All four teams made the playoffs.

The winner of the OJHL playoffs, the Owen Sound Greys, failed to win the 1987 Buckland Cup for the OHA championship.  The league folded in the summer of 1987.  Owen Sound returned to the Midwestern Junior B Hockey League, while the Richmond Hill Dynes, Markham Waxers, and Aurora Eagles all dropped to the Central Junior B Hockey League.  The dormant Orillia Terriers and Newmarket Flyers also jumped to the Central Jr. B league for 1987-88.

Changes
Aurora Eagles return from one-year hiatus.
Orillia Terriers and Newmarket Flyers take one-year hiatus.
Dixie Beehives leave OJHL.
OJHL folds at the end of the season.

Final standings
Note: GP = Games played; W = Wins; L = Losses; OTL = Overtime losses; SL = Shootout losses; GF = Goals for; GA = Goals against; PTS = Points; x = clinched playoff berth; y = clinched division title; z = clinched conference title

1986-87 OJHL Playoffs

Semi-final
 Owen Sound Greys defeated Markham Waxers 4-games-to-1
 Aurora Eagles defeated Richmond Hill Dynes 4-games-to-2

Final
Owen Sound Greys defeated Aurora Eagles 4-games-to-none

OHA Buckland Cup Championship
The 1987 Buckland Cup was a best-of-7 series between the Nickel Centre Power Trains (NOJHL) and the Owen Sound Greys.  The winner moved on to the 1987 Dudley Hewitt Cup Final Series.

Nickel Centre Power Trains (NOJHL) defeated Owen Sound Greys 4-games-to-2
Nickel Centre 8 - Owen Sound 7
Owen Sound 7 - Nickel Centre 0
Owen Sound 7 - Nickel Centre 6
Nickel Centre 7 - Owen Sound 5
Nickel Centre 7 - Owen Sound 4
Nickel Centre 5 - Owen Sound 2

Leading Scorers

See also
 1987 Centennial Cup
 Dudley Hewitt Cup
 List of OJHL seasons
 Northern Ontario Junior Hockey League
 Central Junior A Hockey League
 Thunder Bay Flyers
 1986 in ice hockey
 1987 in ice hockey

References

External links
 Official website of the Ontario Junior Hockey League
 Official website of the Canadian Junior Hockey League

Ontario Junior Hockey League seasons
OPJHL